Yangming District is a district of the prefecture-level city of Mudanjiang, Heilongjiang province, China.

Administrative divisions 
Yangming District is divided into 4 subdistricts and 4 townships. 
3 subdistricts
 Yangming, Qianjin, Xinxing and Hualinxiangjiaochang
4 towns
 Tieling, Hualin, Modaoshi and Wulin

Notes and references 

Yangming
Mudanjiang